The Old Eagle Tavern (historically known as the Eagle Tavern) is a historic building located at 431, 433 South Broad Street at the corner of Ferry Street in Trenton, Mercer County, New Jersey. The building was built in 1765 by Robert Waln. The building operated as a tavern and hotel from 1765 to 1896. It was added to the National Register of Historic Places on November 3, 1972 for its architectural, commercial, and political significance. The building is also a contributing property of the Trenton Ferry Historic District, which was listed on June 26, 2013.

See also
National Register of Historic Places listings in Mercer County, New Jersey

References

Buildings and structures in Trenton, New Jersey
Hotel buildings on the National Register of Historic Places in New Jersey
Hotel buildings completed in 1765
National Register of Historic Places in Trenton, New Jersey
New Jersey Register of Historic Places
Taverns in New Jersey